1. FC Neubrandenburg 04 is the German football club based in Neubrandenburg, Mecklenburg-Vorpommern, playing in the 2019-20 Verbandsliga Mecklenburg-Vorpommern (VI).

History 
The earliest forerunner of 1. FC Neubrandenburg 04 was founded in 1947, as SG Fritz Reuter Neubrandenburg, which became BSG Energie Neubrandenburg in 1950 and BSG Turbine Neubrandenburg in 1952. Turbine Neubrandenburg reached the second tier DDR-Liga of East Germany in the 1954–55 season, and 10 years later, as SC Neubrandenburg, even played one season in the top-flight DDR-Oberliga. From 1965 until 1990, the club was known as BSG Post Neubrandenburg, and MSV Post Neubrandenburg and SV Post Telekom Neubrandenburg after German reunification. Until 1999, the club was known as FC Neubrandenburg when it became FC Tollense Neubrandenburg after a merger with SV Tollense Neubrandenburg, and finally in 2004, the club was created as 1. FC Neubrandenburg 04. The club played in the fifth tier NOFV-Oberliga Nord, having been promoted as 2010–11 Verbandsliga Mecklenburg-Vorpommern (VI) champions, but withdrew at the end of the 2015–16 season, because of insolvency.

Summary of previous names 
 1947–1950 SG Fritz Reuter Neubrandenburg
 1950–1952 BSG Energie Neubrandenburg
 1952–1961 BSG Turbine Neubrandenburg
 1961–1965 SC Neubrandenburg
 1965–1990 BSG Post Neubrandenburg
 1990–1991 MSV Post Neubrandenburg
 1991–1993 SV Post Telekom Neubrandenburg
 1993–1999 FC Neubrandenburg
 1999–2004 FC Tollense Neubrandenburg
 since 2004 1. FC Neubrandenburg 04

Honours 
The club's honours:
 Verbandsliga Mecklenburg-Vorpommern
 Champions: 2011
 Runners-up: 2010
 Landesliga Mecklenburg-Vorpommern Ost
 Champions: 2006
 Mecklenburg-Vorpommern Cup
 Winners: 1992, 2014

Stadium 
1. FC Neubrandenburg 04 plays its home fixtures at the 2,500 capacity Ligaplatz am Jahnstadion.

References

External links 
 1. FC Neubrandenburg 04 

Football clubs in Germany
Football clubs in Mecklenburg-Western Pomerania
Association football clubs established in 2004
2004 establishments in Germany
Neubrandenburg
Works association football clubs in Germany